House of the Federation may refer to:

House of Federation, the upper house of parliament in Ethiopia
Federation Council (Russia), the upper house of parliament in Russia
House of Representatives of the Federation of Bosnia and Herzegovina, the lower house of parliament in Bosnia and Herzegovina
Senate of Pakistan, the upper legislative chamber in Pakistan